Gonzalo Gabriel Castillo Cabral (born 17 October 1990) is a Uruguayan footballer who plays as a defender for The Strongest in the Bolivian Primera División.

References

External links 
 Gonzalo Castillo at playmakerstats.com (English version of ogol.com.br)

1990 births
Living people
Uruguayan footballers
Uruguayan expatriate footballers
Cerro Largo F.C. players
Atenas de San Carlos players
Deportivo Maldonado players
Montevideo City Torque players
C.A. Progreso players
The Strongest players
Uruguayan Primera División players
Uruguayan Segunda División players
Bolivian Primera División players
Association football defenders
Uruguayan expatriate sportspeople in Bolivia
Expatriate footballers in Bolivia
People from Melo, Uruguay